This is a list of notable events that happened in the Philippines in the year 1897.

Incumbents

Spanish Colonial Government
Governor-General: 
 Camilo de Polavieja (until April 15)
 José de Lachambre (April 15 – 23)
 Fernándo Primo de Rivera (starting April 23)

Philippine Revolutionary Government (Tejeros Government)
Vice President: 
 Mariano Trías (March 22 – November 2)
Captain general: Artemio Ricarte

Republic of Biak-na-Bato
Vice President: 
 Mariano Trías (March 22 – November 2)

Events

January
 January 4 – Eleven of fifteen Filipinos which would be called the Fifteen Martyrs of Bicol are executed in Bagumbayan.
 January 11 – Thirteen Filipinos which would be called the Thirteen Martyrs of Bagumbayan are executed.

February
 February 6:
 Ten Katipunan members convicted of subversion are executed in Bagumbayan, Manila.
 A revolt in parts of Negros Oriental led by native priests ends in a battle with the defeat of the natives from the Spanish forces.
 February 13 – Governor-General Camilo de Polavieja begins his campaign with 16,000 Spanish soldiers to regain Cavite from Filipino revolutionaries.
 February 17 – Filipino forces win in the Battle of Zapote Bridge occurred in the boundary of Las Piñas and Cavite.
 February 19 – Spaniards recaptures Silang, Cavite in a battle.
 February 25 – Spaniards recaptures Dasmariñas, Cavite in a battle.

March
 March 22 – The two factions of the Katipunan are convened at the Tejeros Convention to resolve the leadership status in the organization.
 March 23 – Nineteen Filipinos which would be called the Nineteen Martyrs of Aklan are executed in Kalibo.

May
 May 10 – Andrés Bonifacio and his brother Procopio Bonifacio are killed in Maragondon, Cavite.

November
 November 1 – The Republic of Biak-na-Bato is established by Emilio Aguinaldo and his fellow revolutionaries, the first republic to be established in the Philippines.

December
 December 14 – The Pact of Biak-na-Bato is signed between Governor-General Fernando Primo de Rivera and Emilio Aguinaldo to end the Philippine Revolution.

Holidays
As a colony of Spanish Empire and being a catholic, the following were considered holidays:
 January 1 – New Year's Day
 April 15 – Maundy Thursday
 April 16 – Good Friday
 December 25 – Christmas Day

Births
 January 23 – Ildefonso Santos, Filipino poet, sculptor, and writer (d. 1984)
 March 3 – José Romero, Filipino politician (d. 1978)
 June 29 – George J. Willmann, Naturalized Filipino missionary from the United States. (d. 1977)
 September 11 - Francisca Susano, Filipino supercentenarian, (d. 2021)
 December 3 – Elisa Ochoa, first Filipina in the Congress of the Philippines (d. 1978)

Deaths
 January 4 – Executed eleven of the Fifteen Martyrs of Bicol.
 January 11 – Executed Thirteen Martyrs of Bagumbayan.
José Dizon, one of the founders of Katipunan
 February 6 – Executed members of Katipunan:
Román Basa (b. 1848)
Teodoro Plata (b. 1866)
Vicente Molina
Hermenegildo de los Reyes
José Trinidad
Pedro Nicodemus
Feliciano del Rosario
Gervasio Samson
Doroteo Dominguez
Apolonio de la Cruz
 February 17 – Edilberto Evangelista, Filipino civil engineer and general (b. 1862)
 March 23 – Executed Nineteen Martyrs of Aklan.
 May 10 – Andrés Bonifacio, Filipino nationalist and revolutionary; one of the founders of Katipunan (b. 1863)

Unknown dates 
Those executed after January 11, 1897:
Hugo Perez
Pedro Joson
Marcello de los Santos Esguerra
Eugenio de los Reyes y Herrera
Valentin Matias Lagasca y Cruz

References